Scopula walkeri is a moth of the family Geometridae. It is found on Sri Lanka.

Description
Its wingspan is about 34 mm. In male, antennae possess serrations and the fascicles of cilia longer than female. Color ochreous grey with more irrorated fuscous. The medial line diffused, and on hindwing embracing the cell-spot. The patches beyond the postmedial line replaced by black marks. Female more irrorated with fuscous color, often prominently so, and with diffused prominent lines.

References

Moths described in 1883
walkeri
Moths of Sri Lanka